The Booty Tape is the commercial debut mixtape by American rapper Ugly God. It was released on August 4, 2017, by Asylum Records. Recording sessions took place from 2015 to 2017, with all the writing, recording and its executive production credited to Ugly God himself, alongside the additional production from Danny Wolf and Nikko Bunkin, among others. The mixtape features a solo guest appearance from American rapper Wiz Khalifa.

Singles 
On March 16, 2016, Ugly God premiered a song, called "Water" through his account on SoundCloud. It was re-released for digital download as the official lead single for his upcoming commercial debut project on November 19, 2016, by Asylum Records. The song peaked at number 80 on the US Billboard Hot 100.

"Fuck Ugly God" was released as the album's second single on June 27, 2017.  "No Lies" was released as the album's third and final single on July 31, 2017. The song features a guest appearance from American rapper Wiz Khalifa.

Promotional singles 
The album's first promotional single, "Bitch!", was released on February 1, 2017. The album's second promotional single, "Stop Smoking Black & Milds", was released on August 3, 2017.

Commercial Performance
In the United States, The Booty Tape debuted at number 27 on the US Billboard 200 chart, earning 12,000 album-equivalent units, with less than 3,000 coming from pure album sales in its first week.

Track listing 

Sample credits
 "Welcome to the Booty Tape" contains a sample from "Mom Reacts to Ugly God" from YouTube personality Cufboys.
 "Bitch!" contains a sample from "Solid", performed by Duwap Kaine.

Charts

References 

2017 mixtape albums
Ugly God albums

Cloud rap albums
Dirty rap albums
Asylum Records albums